The 1868 United States presidential election in Minnesota took place on November 3, 1868, as part of the 1868 United States presidential election. State voters chose four representatives, or electors, to the Electoral College, who voted for president and vice president.

Minnesota was won by Ulysses S. Grant, formerly the 6th Commanding General of the United States Army (R-Illinois), running with Speaker of the House Schuyler Colfax, with 60.88% of the popular vote, against the 18th governor of New York, Horatio Seymour (D–New York), running with former Senator Francis Preston Blair, Jr., with 39.12% of the vote.

Results

See also
 United States presidential elections in Minnesota

References

Minnesota
1868
1868 Minnesota elections